Sidney Zoltak (b 1931 in Siemiatycze Poland), is a Polish-Canadian author, Holocaust educator and the subject of several films. Zoltak has been featured on CBC in a special done by the channel.

Early life 
When Nazi Germany invaded Poland in the invasion that launched the Second World War, Zoltak's hometown of Siemiatycze was occupied by German troops. However under the terms of the Molotov-Ribbentrop Pact, the Soviet-German non aggression agreement, much of Poland was divided into the Soviet sphere of influence. Then a surprise invasion by Germany on June 22, 1941 saw the Germans once again occupy Siemiatycze. The town's Jews were rounded up, forced to live in a ghetto, and by November, those left alive were shipped to Treblinka.

Film: Reunions 
The documentary, produced in co-operation with The March of the Living Digital Archive Project, is about Zoltak's return to Poland to meet the people that saved his life.
The film was screened at the Hamilton Jewish Film Festival, the Vancouver Jewish Film Festival, and the Big Sky Documentary Film Festival.

His memoir, My Silent Pledge: A Journey of Struggle, Survival and Remembrance, was published by Guernica Editions, in 2013.
In his book Witness: Passing the Torch of Holocaust Memory to New Generations author Eli Rubenstein recounts a scene from  the film, told in the presence of the son of his rescuer and hundreds of March of the Living student and recorded at Treblinka, where nearly one million Jews were murdered. 
"When we got back to our hometown, less than one percent had survived. Less than 70 from a community of 7,000. The most difficult part for me was that none of my classmates, none of my friends survived. I am the only one. I think about it. The
only reunion I can have is in this place among the memorial stones," Zoltak is quoted as saying.

References 

 http://www.cbc.ca/news/world/montreal-man-reunites-with-polish-rescuer-who-saved-him-from-nazis-1.2662273
 http://www.cija.ca/cjhsd/
 https://www.guernicaeditions.com/title/9781550718072
 http://o.canada.com/news/holocaust-survivors-shameful-that-pier-21-not-displaying-memorial-to-victims-of-voyage-of-the-damned
 https://collections.ushmm.org/search/catalog/pa1143062

1931 births
Living people
People from Siemiatycze County
Treblinka extermination camp survivors